Roman usurpers were individuals or groups of individuals who obtained or tried to obtain power by force and without legitimate legal authority. Usurpation was endemic during the Roman imperial era, especially from the crisis of the third century onwards, when political instability became the rule.

The first dynasty of the Roman Empire, the Julio-Claudians (27 BC – 68 AD), justified the imperial throne by familial ties, namely with the connection (although only through adoption) with Augustus, the first emperor. Eventually, conflicts within the Julio-Claudian family triggered a series of murders, which led to the demise of the line. Nero died with public enemy status, and following his suicide, a short civil war began, known as the Year of the Four Emperors. The Flavian dynasty started with Vespasian, only to end with the assassination of his second son, Domitian. The 2nd century was a period of relative peace that was marked by the rule of the so-called Five Good Emperors, but the next century would be characterised by endemic political instability, one of the factors that eventually contributed to the fall of the Western Roman Empire.

Instability
Commodus, the last emperor of the Antonine dynasty, was remembered by contemporaneous chronicles as an unpopular ruler notorious for his extravagance and cruelty, and he was assassinated in 192. Without sons to be his heir, a struggle for power immediately broke out among the governors of the most important provinces. Pertinax was elevated to the purple and recognized by his peers, but after his murder by a restive Praetorian Guard, Septimius Severus decided to make his bid for power and usurped the throne. Although initially a usurper, Severus managed to remain in power for the next 18 years and died a natural death while he was campaigning in northern Britain. The 235 death of Severus Alexander, the last emperor of the Severan dynasty, triggered what historians call the Crisis of the Third Century. From 235 to the accession of Diocletian and the establishment of the Tetrarchy in 286, Rome saw 28 emperors, only two of whom had a natural death (from the plague). However, there were also 38 usurpers who raised revolts across the empire, a clear sign that the security of the frontiers was not the only problem within the Roman world. Usurpation attempts were a constant worry for the emperors in this period since it was a too-common method of acceding the throne. Successful usurpers were usually provincial governors; commanders of a large grouping of Roman legions; or prefects of the Praetorian Guard, which had control of Rome, where the imperial palace still lay.

The danger of usurpation was greater after the death of an emperor when his successor was not accepted by all provinces. Usually, the legions acclaimed their own commander as emperor on news of the accession of a less popular man. The acclaimed emperor, usually a provincial governor, would then march to Italy or where the opponent was stationed to contest for the purple. However, since legionaries disliked fighting against their brothers in arms, battles between legions rarely transpired. Two main factors decided the success of a usurpation attempt: the loyalty of the legionaries, which were heavily dependent on the amount of booty or monetary prizes promised on victory, and the trust of the military abilities of the commander upon which depended morale. Failure of either part to fulfill one or two of the criteria normally resulted in a mutiny and the death at the hands of their own soldiers. Since the emperors had the status quo and political credibility behind them, the usurper had to be a charismatic man to avoid doubts in his ranks and an untimely death. Valerian I, who defeated Aemilian, himself a usurper, is an example of that kind. Other usurpers, like Philip the Arab, became emperor by a planned murder directed at an established sovereign (in that case, Gordian III).

However successful, the usurpation procedure always left the new emperor in a somewhat fragile political position since the throne had been attained by violent means. The danger of another usurper was always present, and the first measures taken were inevitably to put trusted men into important commands. Frequently, the emperor embellished his ancestry and early life to enhance his credibility or the right to the throne. Mentions of obscure genealogical relations with previous popular emperors were common and certainly confused historians. However, most of all, the usurper manoeuvred to keep his legions happy since he owed his power to their continued loyalty.

Practical effects

The usurpation mania of the 3rd century had profound effects in the empire's bureaucratic and military organisation. Fear of potential rivals was to be the main driving force for the evolution of the Roman world from the early to the late Empire.

One of the most striking changes was the division and multiplication of the Roman provinces. Provinces were ruled by a governor, whether a proconsul, propraetor or procurator, and were ascribed a certain number of legions, according to the degree of pacification that they required. Thus, the governors of, for instance, Moesia or Pannonia in the Danubian border had huge military contingents on their hands. The greater the number of legions a provincial governor had, the greater the temptation to make a bid to the throne. And indeed, most usurpation attempts came from the Asian province of Syria, and the Rhine and Danube provinces, frontier provinces with large military presence. Thus, provinces were slowly divided into smaller units to avoid concentration of power and military capacity in the hands of one man. Syria is a perfect example: a single province in AD 14, it was in the mid-3rd century divided into four different administrative regions: Tres Daciae, Cappadocia, Syria Coele and Syria Palestina. Similarly, Moesia and Pannonia were divided into Superior and Inferior (Upper and Lower) halves; Dardania was later separated from Moesia and Pannonia was further divided into Prima, Valeria, Savia and Secunda.

As the fear of civil war increased, the emperor felt the need of legions permanently in his reach to be deployed against possible internal threats. That caused the geographic division of the army into limitanei legions, which remained in the borders, and comitatenses, which were stationed in strategic points within the empire. Legio II Parthica, which was garrisoned in the Alban mountains outside Rome from the time of Septimius Severus, was among the first comitatenses created.

Men had to be removed from the frontier garrisons to create the internal legions. A smaller number of border legions meant less-secure borders and eventually, raids from the Germanic and Gothic tribes against the Rhine and the Danube became more frequent. In the East, the Persian Empire grew bolder in its attacks on the Roman communities. Moreover, since individual initiative was a common way to assume the imperial purple, the giving of important commands to competent generals was asking for trouble. Jealousy and fear often prevented the presence of the right man to deal with a specific threat, and so marginal provinces were often raided, sacked or conquered.

Assessment of usurpers

The only usurpers whose early life and specific circumstances of rebellion are known with reasonable certainty are the ones who would become emperors. The unsuccessful usurpation attempts inevitably ended with the rebel's execution, murder or suicide and the subsequent erasure of his life from all records. That often causes confusion in the contemporaneous sources that are contradictory in the details of a certain rebellion. For instance, the usurper Uranius is placed by some in the reign of Elagabalus and by others in the time of Gallienus.

Every new emperor, either legal or illegal, marked the beginning of his rule by minting new coins, both to have the prestige of declaring oneself as Augustus and to pay the loyal soldiers their share. Thus, coinage is often the only evidence of a determined usurpation, but the number of coin types with the effigy of a usurper might not be equal to the total number of usurpations. The presence of minting facilities certainly allowed short-term usurpers to release their coinage, but on the other hand, a man capable of sustaining a rebellion for a couple of months in a remote area might fail to produce his own coins by lack of access to the instruments of minting technology.

Later assessment of usurpations demonstrated that some are questionable or even fictitious. Gallienus was the emperor who suffered greatest number of usurpations, with a record of 14 attempts (excluding the Gallic Empire secession) in 15 years of rule. However, three of these are clear fabrications, either contemporaneous to show the invincibility of the emperor or added by later writers to embellish their own prose.

See also
List of Roman usurpers

References

Further reading
Omissi, Adrastos (2018): Emperors and Usurpers in the Later Roman Empire, Oxford University Press